Iowa Select Farms is a hog processing operation, the largest in Iowa, and the eighth largest in the United States.

Iowa Select Farms was founded by Jeff Hansen, son of a farmer, with his wife Deb Hansen. Starting in Jeff Hansen's father's barn, the Hansens hog operation grew, after which they founded Modern Hog Concepts, supplying equipment to other hog farms. By the early 1990s, Modern Hog Concepts had gross income of about 90 million dollars. In 1992 the Hansens returned to running their own operation, founding Iowa Select Farms. In 2021, Iowa Select Farms (which remains privately owned by the Hansens) employed about 7,400 people and brought about five million pigs to market. Select Farms remains headquartered in Iowa Falls.

Operational issues
Toward the end of the 20th century, hog farming evolved from mostly small multi-use farms to large industrial style operations. Select Farms is one of many of these, and this hog-production method has occasioned criticism on account of pollution, smell, visual blight, animal cruelty, social decay, and other issues. Select Farms had taken some steps to ameliorate some of these nuisances to a degree, including planting tree barriers (to reduce wind and thus diffusion of odor carrying dust) and installing electrostatic fencing which also slows dust diffusion. Select Farms feeds Phytase to its hogs, which reduces pollution-causing phosphorus in the pig manure.

In 2020, during the supply chain crisis, Select Farms' meat packing capability dropped, leading to oversupply of pigs. Select Farms leased additional processing space, cut down weight gain of pigs, and – like other hog producers – euthanized some hogs using VSD+ (ventilation shutdown plus), a controversial procedure whereby Hogs are suffocated (the plus indicates that high temperatures or extra carbon dioxide, or both, are also involved). Silence (the cessation of squealing) occurs after about an hour after which about 99.7% of the pigs are dead.

Foundation
In 2006, the Hansens founded the Jeff And Deb Hansen Foundation. The Foundation supports various efforts, including cancer research, food banks, and veterans programs.

References

Farms in Iowa
Pigs
Iowa Falls, Iowa